Puntas de Valdez is a village in the San José Department of southern Uruguay.

Geography
The headwaters of Arroyo Valdez lie west of the village.

History
On 14 November 1974, its status was elevated to "Pueblo" (village) by the Act of Ley Nº 14.296.

Population
In 2011 Puntas de Valdez had a population of 1,491.
 
Source: Instituto Nacional de Estadística de Uruguay

References

External links
INE map of Puntas de Valdez

Populated places in the San José Department